Pfaff Island is one of the Bennett Islands, lying just south of Granicher Island in Hanusse Bay. Mapped from air photos taken by Ronne Antarctic Research Expedition (RARE) (1947–48) and Falkland Islands and Dependencies Aerial Survey Expedition (FIDASE) (1956–57). Named by United Kingdom Antarctic Place-Names Committee (UK-APC) for Alexius B.I.F. Pfaff (1825–86), German physicist who made pioneer investigations of the plastic deformation of ice, in Switzerland, in 1874–76.

See also 
 List of Antarctic and sub-Antarctic islands

Islands of Graham Land
Loubet Coast